Mohammed Abdel Karim Al Ghezali is a citizen of Yemen who was one of the founders of Al Qaeda in the Arabian Peninsula, in 2009, and remains one of its senior leaders.
CBS News reported that Al Ghezali appeared in a September 2009 fund-raising video with Said Ali Al Shiri, the second in command of Al Qaeda in the Arabian Peninsula.

The Saudi Gazette reports that Al Ghezali "assisted in the movements of Abdullah Al-Asiri, the author of the August’s failed assassination attempt on Prince Muhammad Bin Naif."

On January 4, 2018, US counter-intelligence officials placed Al Ghazali, and two other individuals, on its list of specially designated terrorists.  The US State Department described al Ghazali, Wanas al-Faqih and Abukar Ali Adnan as senior leaders of three different offshoots of al Qaeda.  Abukar Ali Adnan was the deputy leader of Al Shabaab.  Wanas al-Faqih was a leader of Al Qaeda in the Islamic Maghreb.

References

Al-Qaeda propagandists
Living people
Year of birth missing (living people)
Al-Qaeda in the Arabian Peninsula
Yemeni al-Qaeda members
Yemeni propagandists